A short circuit is an electrical circuit that allows a current to travel along an unintended path with no or a very low electrical impedance.

Short Circuit may also refer to:

Film
 Short Circuit (1943 film), an Italian film
Short Circuit (1986 film), a film about a robot that comes to life
Short Circuit 2, the 1988 sequel
 Short Circuits (film), a 2006 Slovene film
 Short Circuit (2019 film), Gujarati science fiction comedy-drama film
 Short Circuit (short series), a Walt Disney Animation Studios experimental short series

Music
Short Circuit: Live at the Electric Circus, a 1978 compilation album of English punk and reggae
Short Circuit (I've Sound album), 2003, or the title song
Short Circuit II (album), a 2007 album by I've Sound
Short Circuit III, a 2010 album by I've Sound
 Short Circuit: Original Motion Picture Soundtrack, soundtrack album for the eponymous 1986 film
 "Short Circuit", a song by Daft Punk from their 2001 album Discovery

Other uses
Short Circuit (video game), based on the 1986 film

See also 
 Short Circutz, a series of computer animated web short films
 Nick Cannon Presents: Short Circuitz, MTV sketch comedy TV show
Short-circuit evaluation, a form of boolean evaluation in programming
Short-circuit test
Short (disambiguation)
Circuit (disambiguation)
Open circuit (disambiguation)